Euskadi is Basque language for the Basque Country, an autonomous community in northern Spain.

Euskadi or Euzkadi may also refer to:

 Euzkadi (newspaper), a Basque nationalist newspaper 1913–1939
 Euskadi (Continental cycling team), a former Spanish cycling team 
 Euskadi–Murias, a former Spanish cycling team 
 C.D. Euzkadi, a former Mexican football team

See also

 ETA (separatist group) (Euskadi Ta Askatasuna, 'Basque Homeland and Liberty')